The Peter Guice Memorial Bridge consists of dual two-lane automobile bridges carrying I-26/US 74 across the Green River, located between East Flat Rock and Saluda, in Henderson County, North Carolina. In 1993, both bridges were rehabilitated after missing welds and poor welds were found in the structures.

As of July 2018, both bridges are rated structurally deficient and functionally obsolete in the National Bridge Inventory. A major rehabilitation project for the bridges is scheduled to begin in 2021.

The bridge is dedicated to the memory of Peter Guice, who built the first toll bridge over the Green River in 1820; it replaced a hazardous ford along Howard Gap Road.  An unrecorded flood washed out the toll bridge, but was replaced by his son; the second toll bridge was destroyed by flood in 1916.  The current bridge is located high above where the former bridges once stood.

See also
 
 
 
 List of bridges in the United States by height

References

External links
 Peter Guice Memorial Bridge

Buildings and structures in Henderson County, North Carolina
Bridges completed in 1968
Road bridges in North Carolina
U.S. Route 74
Interstate 26
Bridges on the Interstate Highway System
Bridges of the United States Numbered Highway System
Steel bridges in the United States
Girder bridges in the United States